Memory Vague is a 2009 audio-visual project by Oneohtrix Point Never, the alias of electronic musician Daniel Lopatin. It was released as a limited-edition DVD-R by Root Strata on June 1, 2009.

Background
Memory Vague compiles found footage of commercials, animation and music videos sourced from YouTube videos and edited by Lopatin in Windows Movie Maker. It collects several videos previously uploaded to YouTube via Lopatin's sunsetcorp channel, including the profile-raising videos "Angel" and "Nobody Here." The DVD features several of Lopatin's "eccojams": audio-visual pieces which typically sample micro-excerpts of 80's sources and "slow them down narcotically" with effects such as echo and pitch shifting added in a manner reminiscent of chopped and screwed styles. Due to the stylistic effects present in the project, Memory Vague is considered a pioneering work in the vaporwave genre.

Track listing
Zones Without People
Angel
Ships Without Meaning
Memory Vague
Nest 5900
Chandelier's Dream
Unmaking the World
Heart of a Champion
Radiation
Computer Vision
Nobody Here

Personnel
Daniel Lopatin – music
 Maxwell August Croy – design, layout

References

External links
Official website
Memory Vague on IMDB
sunsetcorp on YouTube (featuring videos of "angel" and "nobody here")

2009 video albums
Oneohtrix Point Never albums
Experimental music albums by American artists
Collage film
2000s avant-garde and experimental films